Christopher Duffy (1936 – 16 November 2022) was a British military historian.

Duffy read history at Balliol College, Oxford, where he graduated in 1961 with the DPhil. Afterwards, he taught military history at the Royal Military Academy Sandhurst and the college of the British General Staff. He was secretary-general of the British Commission for Military History and vice-president of the Military History Society of Ireland. From 1996 to 2001, he was research professor at the De Montfort University, Leicester. He then worked as a freelance author.

Duffy's special interest was the military history of the European modern age, in particular the history of the German, Prussian, and Austrian armed forces. He wrote two books on the Jacobite Rising in Scotland in 1745. He was most famous for his writings about Frederick the Great and the Seven Years' War. Duffy was fluent in six languages and published some twenty books about military history topics, several of which have been translated into German.

Duffy died on 16 November 2022, at the age of 86.

Works 
 The Wild Goose and the Eagle: A Life of Marshal von Browne, 1705-1757, Chatto & Windus, 1964.
 Borodino and the War of 1812, Sphere, 1972. Scribner, 1973.   
 Army of Frederick the Great , David & Charles, 1974, . (Superseded by an illustrated second edition in 1996, .)
 The Army of Maria Theresa: The Armed Forces of Imperial Austria, 1740-1780, Vancouver 1977, . (Superseded by the two volume The Austrian Army in the Seven Years War in 2000 and 2008.)
 Austerlitz 1805, Shoe String Press, 1977.
 Siege Warfare, 2 volumes, Routledge, 1979 and 1985.
 Frederick the Great: A Military Life, London 1985.
 The Fortress in the Age of Vauban and Frederick the Great, 1660-1789, London 1985.
 Russia's Military Way to the West: Origins and Nature of Russian Military Power, 1700-1800, Routledge, 1985.  
 The Military Experience in the Age of Reason, London 1987.
 Red Storm on the Reich: The Soviet March on Germany, 1945, London 1991. 
 Army of Frederick the Great, 1974, Second Edition, Emperor's Press, 1996.
 Eagles over the Alps: Suvorov in Italy and Switzerland, 1799, Emperor's Press, 1999.
 Instrument of War: The Austrian Army in the Seven Years War, Emperor's Press, 2000.
 Prussia's Glory: Rossbach and Leuthen, Emperor's Press, 2003.
 Fire And Stone: The Science of Fortress Warfare 1660-1860, Booksales, 2006, .
 Through German Eyes: The British and the Somme, 1916, London 2006.  
 The '45: Bonnie Prince Charlie and the Untold Story of the Jacobite Rising, Phoenix Press, 2007.  
 By Force of Arms: The Austrian Army in the Seven Years War, Volume 2, Emperor's Press, 2008.
 The Best of Enemies: Germans against Jacobites, 1746, Bitter Books/Emperor's Press, 2013.
 Fight for a Throne: The Jacobite '45 Reconsidered, Helion and Company, 2015.

References

External links 
 Christopher Duffy on Emperor's Press
 Christopher Duffy on Orion Books

1936 births
2022 deaths
Alumni of Balliol College, Oxford
Academics of De Montfort University
British military historians
Historians of the Napoleonic Wars
Academics of the Royal Military Academy Sandhurst